The Mukwonago Chief is a weekly newspaper based in Mukwonago, Wisconsin.  It is published by Mukwonago Publications and Journal Communications.  It is primarily distributed in Mukwonago, but is also distributed in other surrounding towns and villages.

In 2017, the Mukwonago Chief was purchased by Gannett Company Inc. and became part of the Milwaukee Journal Sentinel. The paper now operates under their Lake Country Now segment.

References

Walworth County, Wisconsin
Waukesha County, Wisconsin
Newspapers published in Wisconsin